The 1962 French motorcycle Grand Prix was a FIM event held on 13 May 1962 at Charade Circuit Clermont-Ferrand. It was part of the 1962 Grand Prix motorcycle racing season.

1962 French Grand Prix 50cc final standings
8 laps

Number of finishers: 17

Fastest Lap Jan Huberts 4:48.0 =

1962 French Grand Prix 125cc final standings
13 laps

Number of finishers: 12

Fastest Lap Kunimitsu Takahashi 4:12.8 =

1962 French Grand Prix 250cc final standings
16 laps

Number of finishers: 6

Fastest Lap Tom Phillis 3:59.7 =

1962 French Grand Prix Side-car final standings
13 laps

Number of finishers: 14

Fastest Lap Florian Camathias / Horst Burkhardt 4:19.0 =

References
 Büla, Maurice & Schertenleib, Jean-Claude (2001). Continental Circus 1949-2000. Chronosports S.A. 

Motorcycle Grand Prix
French
French motorcycle Grand Prix